Jonathan Seth Rosenberg (born March 14, 1958) is an American historian and author.  He is a professor at Hunter College.

Education and career 
Rosenberg attended music school at Juilliard, and worked for a time as a classical musician.  He later went back to get his PhD in history from Harvard University in 1997.  His thesis, which he later published in expanded form as a book, was titled How Far the Promised Land? World Affairs and the American Civil Rights Movement from the First World War to Vietnam, and was directed by Akira Iriye and Ernest R. May.  He has been at Hunter College since 2001.

Books

References

Living people
Harvard Graduate School of Arts and Sciences alumni
Hunter College faculty
1958 births
American historians